The W.A.R. P-51 Mustang is a 53% near-scale homebuilt replica of a North American P-51 Mustang fighter.

Specifications (W.A.R. P-51 Mustang)

See also

Notes

References

WAR P51 Mustang

External links
 War Aircraft Replicas International Inc 
 W.A.R. Aircraft Replicas International

Homebuilt aircraft
P-51
Single-engined tractor aircraft
Low-wing aircraft
1970s United States sport aircraft
North American P-51 Mustang replicas